The Historic Quarter is the southeasternmost district of the city of Agoura Hills, south of the Ventura Freeway (101) in western Los Angeles County, California.

Description
The Historic Quarter is made up of two sections — the buildings along and just south of Agoura Road that are akin to a town's Main Street, as well the development from Cornell Road on the north side to Agoura Road on the south which was built in a more contemporary style.

This district's buildings are constructed in a style mixture of small-town Americana and another wood-based style reminiscent of Rustic architecture. The higher areas in the southern section have views of the rest of Agoura Hills, and the Simi Hills to the north.

The opening of a club, restaurants, and the historic Blue Star Playhouse, have renewed the district towards the liveliness it once had on old Route 101. There has been increased construction of new office space transforming the area also.

See also
Santa Monica Mountains National Recreation Area

Neighborhoods in Agoura Hills, California